TORCH syndrome is a cluster of symptoms caused by congenital infection with toxoplasmosis, rubella, cytomegalovirus, herpes simplex, and other organisms including syphilis, parvovirus, and Varicella zoster. Zika virus is considered the most recent member of TORCH infections.

Signs and symptoms 
Though caused by different infections, the signs and symptoms of TORCH syndrome are consistent. They include hepatosplenomegaly (enlargement of the liver and spleen), fever, lethargy, difficulty feeding, anemia, petechiae, purpurae, jaundice, and chorioretinitis. The specific infection may cause additional symptoms.

TORCH syndrome may develop before birth, causing stillbirth, in the neonatal period, or later in life.

Pathophysiology 
TORCH syndrome is caused by in-utero infection with one of the TORCH agents, disrupting fetal development.

Diagnosis
Presence of IgM is diagnostic and persistence of IgG beyond 6–9 months is diagnostic.

Prevention 
TORCH syndrome can be prevented by treating an infected pregnant woman, thereby preventing the infection from affecting the fetus.

Treatment 
The treatment of TORCH syndrome is mainly supportive and depends on the symptoms present; medication is an option for herpes and cytomegalovirus infections.

Epidemiology 
Developing countries are more severely affected by TORCH syndrome.

References 

Congenital disorders
Rare syndromes